Kingsley Dam is located on the east side of Lake McConaughy in central Keith County, Nebraska, and is the second largest hydraulic fill dam in the world. It was built as part of the New Deal project. On the east side of the dam is Lake Ogallala and on the south side is the Kingsley Hydroelectricity Plant. The Nebraska Game and Parks Commission and Central Nebraska Public Power and Irrigation District are also located in this area. Kingsley Dam, the Kingsley Hydroelectricity Plant, the Morning Glory Spillway, and the Outlet Tower – a large structure near the dam used to release water from the lake – are main visual icons of Lake McConaughy.

External links
Kingsley Dam & Lake McConaughy

References

Dams in Nebraska
Hydroelectric power plants in Nebraska
Buildings and structures in Keith County, Nebraska
United States state-owned dams
Dams completed in 1941
Dams on the North Platte River
1941 establishments in Nebraska